The Gotham Independent Film Award for Best Actor was one of the annual Gotham Independent Film Awards awarded between 2013 and 2020. In 2021, it was replaced by the gender neutral awards for Outstanding Lead Performance and Outstanding Supporting Performance.

Winners and nominees

2010s

2020s

Multiple nominees

3 nominations
 Adam Driver

2 nominations
 Willem Dafoe
 Oscar Isaac
 Ethan Hawke
 Adam Sandler

See also
 Academy Award for Best Actor
 Critics' Choice Movie Award for Best Actor
 Independent Spirit Award for Best Male Lead
 BAFTA Award for Best Actor in a Leading Role
 Golden Globe Award for Best Actor – Motion Picture Drama
 Golden Globe Award for Best Actor – Motion Picture Musical or Comedy
 Screen Actors Guild Award for Outstanding Performance by a Male Actor in a Leading Role

References

Best Actor
Film awards for lead actor
Awards established in 2013
Awards disestablished in 2021